The following are flight simulator software applications that can be downloaded or played for free. Several items are outdated. Please notice 'free' is not the same as open source. Free games may have limited options or include advertisements.

Examples

 1942: The Pacific Air War
 Ace Combat
 Ace Combat Infinity (shut down in 2018; no longer available)
 Ace Combat: Assault Horizon (demo; no longer available)
 Air Warrior
 B-17 Flying Fortress (possibly not still available)
 Chuck Yeager's Advanced Flight Trainer
 CRRCSim
 DARWARS
 Digital Combat Simulator
 Dogfights: The Game
 Falcon 4.0 (see FreeFalcon)
 FlightGear
 GeoFS
 Gunship 2000
 Linux Air Combat
 Maestro
 MusicVR
 Microsoft Flight
 Pie in the sky (game engine)
 Red Baron
 Rise of Flight: The First Great Air War
 Second Life
 SGI Dogfight
 SimCopter
 Space Combat
 Top Gun (see: List of Top Gun video games)
 Tres Lunas
 Virtual Military
 War Thunder
 World of Warplanes
 World War II Online
 youbeQ
 YSFlight
 zeseay
 Turboprop Flight Simulator

References

Free flight simulators